Cassandra ("Cass") Fox is an English singer and songwriter. She is best known for writing and singing the 2001 number one hit single "Touch Me", which she co-produced with Rui Da Silva.

Biography
Cassandra Ann Fox was born in North London in 1982 as the only daughter in a large working-class Irish family.   She never had any formal training, or Stage School to guide her, but knew from an early age she wanted to make music.

Fox was spotted by a friend of Portuguese producer Rui Da Silva as she returned from a night out, singing with a reggae band, busking for an "impromptu" jam on the streets of the West End. Numbers were exchanged and she went down to the Roundhouse studios, where she became a permanent fixture at the studio, working and hanging out with the other producers who also worked there. It was while at Roundhouse studies that Fox wrote the lyrics for the now legendary Touch Me, as well as laying down the vocals and helping co-produce the track with Rui. The song, "Touch Me," became the first number one of 2001 and went on to sell over 300,000 copies.

Cass was the first of two support acts on Faithless' Forever Faithless tour in 2005.
Cass later appeared on the 2006 Faithless album To All New Arrivals, providing vocals for the track "Music Matters".  Which charted at No. 38 in the National Charts in the U.K. She has appeared alongside the band on the tour supporting this album in 2007 with support act Calvin Harris.

She has been signed to Ministry of Sound and Island/Universal Records for her album Come Here. Has worked with Rollo, Faithless, Rick Knowles, Ben Langmaid (La Roux) and has performed at Coachella, Wembley, Filmore (San Francisco), Webster Hall (New York City). She has appeared on Top of the Pops' twice', C.D.U.K. Smash Hits t.v. performing her hit "Touch Me" and The Album Chart Show with Faithless singing "Music Matters".  As well as supporting and singing alongside the likes of Lauryn Hill, Keane, and Paolo Nutini.

A version of her song "Little Bird" was remixed into DJ Tiësto's compilation album In Search of Sunrise 5: Los Angeles, released in 2006.  And she has recently worked with Paul Oakenfold on a cover and new vocal of her hit record Touch Me which was released in 2014.

Discography
Albums
 Come HereOriginal release (19 September 2005)
 Come Here''Re-release (19 June 2006)

Singles
 "Touch Me" with Rui Da Silva (1 January 2001)
 "Out of My Reach" (5 September 2005)
 "Army of One" (12 June 2006)
 "Little Bird" (12 June 2006)
 "Touch Me" – new version (30 October 2006)

Demo sampler releases

References

External links
Cass Fox Myspace
Cass Fox AllMusic biography
Cassandra Fox on Discogs

Living people
English dance musicians
English electronic musicians
English soul musicians
21st-century English women singers
21st-century English singers
1982 births
Island Records artists